Timothy Darrell Russ (born June 22, 1956) is an American actor, director, screenwriter, musician and amateur astronomer. He is best known for his roles as Lieutenant Commander Tuvok on Star Trek: Voyager, Robert Johnson in Crossroads (1986), Casey in East of Hope Street (1998), Frank on Samantha Who?, Principal Franklin on the Nickelodeon sitcom iCarly, and D. C. Montana on The Highwaymen (1987–1988). Most recently, he was in The Rookie: Feds (2022).

Early life, family and education
Russ was born in Washington, D.C. on June 22, 1956 to a government employee mother and a U.S. Air Force officer father. He spent part of his childhood in Turkey. He attended his senior year of high school at Rome Free Academy, from which he graduated in 1974. He  graduated from St. Edward's University with a degree in theater arts. He additionally attended graduate school at Illinois State University where he was inducted into its Hall of Fame.

During his early life, he owned many dogs.

Career

Acting

In 1985, Russ appeared in The Twilight Zone episode "Kentucky Rye" as "Officer #2." He made a brief appearance in the comedy movie Spaceballs as the trooper who shouts "We ain't found shit!" while "combing" the desert with an afro comb.

Russ has been extensively involved in the Star Trek franchise as a voice and film actor, writer, director, and producer. He played several minor roles before landing the role as the main character Tuvok, a character seen from the first, January 1995 episode of Star Trek: Voyager. Russ screen-tested, in 1987, for the role of Geordi La Forge on Star Trek: The Next Generation before gaining the role of Tuvok. Russ went into Voyager as a dedicated Trekkie with an extensive knowledge of Vulcan lore and has played the following roles in the Star Trek universe:

 Devor, a mercenary hijacking the Enterprise-D disguised as a service engineer in the "Starship Mine" episode of The Next Generation (1993)
 T'Kar, a Klingon in the Deep Space Nine episode "Invasive Procedures" (1993)
 A human tactical Lieutenant on the USS Enterprise-B in the film Star Trek Generations (1994).
 The Mirror Universe counterpart of his Voyager character, Tuvok, who was a member of the Terran Resistance in the Deep Space Nine (1995) episode "Through the Looking Glass".

In 1995, Russ co-wrote the story for the Malibu Comics Star Trek: Deep Space Nine #29 and 30, with Mark Paniccia. Russ performed voice acting roles as Tuvok for the computer games Star Trek: Voyager – Elite Force and Star Trek: Elite Force II. Russ is also the director and one of the stars of the fan series Star Trek: Of Gods and Men, the first third of which was released in December 2007, with the remaining two-thirds released in 2008.

Russ's character's name D. C. Montana in The Highwayman was a reference to Trek writer D. C. Fontana.

In 1990, he appeared in an episode of Freddy's Nightmares.

Russ directed and co-starred in Star Trek: Renegades, and in both 2013 and 2014 reprised his role as the voice of Tuvok in the massively multiplayer online game Star Trek Online.

Later work
Russ appeared as Frank, a sarcastic doorman in Christina Applegate's ABC comedy Samantha Who? from 2007 to 2009, and appeared for six seasons as Principal Ted Franklin in Nickelodeon's show iCarly. He also portrayed a doctor on an episode of Hannah Montana, "I Am Hannah, Hear Me Croak."

Russ won an Emmy Award in 2014 for public service ads he did for the FBI's Los Angeles Field Office on intellectual property theft and cyberbullying.

He played Captain Kells in the 2015 Bethesda Game Studios video game Fallout 4.

Music and astronomy
Russ has been a lifelong musician and a singer. In addition, Russ has been an avid amateur astronomer most of his adult life, and is a member of the Los Angeles Astronomical Society. In February 2022, he stated that he owned a 10-inch Dobsonian telescope, an 8" Schmidt-Cassegrain telescope, and a Unistellar eVscope.

Filmography

References

External links

Tim Russ Interviewed at BlankmanInc
Tim Russ interviewed on Krypton Radio's The Event Horizon
Tim Russ interviewed in Sky & Telescope Magazine

1956 births
Living people
20th-century American male actors
20th-century American screenwriters
20th-century American singers
21st-century American male actors
21st-century American screenwriters
21st-century American singers
African-American film directors
African-American male actors
African-American male singers
African-American male writers
African-American screenwriters
African-American television directors
American expatriates in Turkey
American male film actors
American male screenwriters
American male singers
American male television actors
American male video game actors
American male voice actors
American television directors
Film directors from Washington, D.C.
Illinois State University alumni
Male actors from Washington, D.C.
Screenwriters from Washington, D.C.
Singers from Washington, D.C.
St. Edward's University alumni